The McDonald's Championship was a women's professional golf tournament on the LPGA Tour from 1981 through 1993. The first six years  were hosted by White Manor Country Club in Malvern, Pennsylvania, northwest of Philadelphia. In 1987, it moved a short distance south to DuPont Country Club in Wilmington, Delaware.

The tournament was founded by Herb Lotman, founder and CEO of Keystone Foods. His co-founder was Frank Quinn. The 28 year old tournament is still the largest fundraiser in the history of golf donating over $47 million to charity. Herb Lotman was quoted as saying, "everything we did, we did for 'the kids'."

In its first year in 1981, the purse was $150,000 with a winner's share of $22,500, won by Sandra Post. The last edition in 1993 had a purse of $900,000; Laura Davies won by a stroke and took the $135,000 winner's share.

Beginning in 1994, McDonald's sponsored the next sixteen editions of the LPGA Championship, one of the tour's four major championships, and the regular tour event was retired. Play continued at DuPont Country Club in Wilmington from 1994 through 2004, then moved in 2005 to Bulle Rock Golf Course in nearby Havre de Grace, Maryland. After the 2009 edition, McDonald's ended its 29-year relationship with the LPGA Tour.

Winners
McDonald's Championship
1993 Laura Davies
1992 Ayako Okamoto
1991 Beth Daniel (2)
1990 Patty Sheehan (2)
1989 Betsy King (2)
1988 Kathy Postlewait
1987 Betsy King
1986 Juli Inkster
1985 Alice Miller

McDonald's Kids Classic
1984 Patty Sheehan
1983 Beth Daniel

McDonald's Classic
1982 JoAnne Carner

McDonald's Kids Classic
1981 Sandra Post

References

Former LPGA Tour events
Golf in Delaware
Golf in Pennsylvania
McDonald's charities
Recurring sporting events established in 1981
Recurring sporting events disestablished in 1993
1981 establishments in Pennsylvania
1993 disestablishments in Delaware
History of women in Delaware
History of women in Pennsylvania